The Politburo of the 23rd Congress of the Communist Party of the Soviet Union was in session from 1966 to 1971.

The 23rd Congress, the first such event since Nikita Khrushchev's ousting, the Presidium reverted to its previous name; Politburo. Mikoyan and Nikolai Shvernik, the two oldest members, were not reelected to the Presidium, while Arvīds Pelše became the only Presidium débutant. While Brezhnev may have been General Secretary, he did not have a majority in the Presidium; when Kosygin and Podgorny agreed on policy, which was not often the case, Brezhnev found himself in the minority. Brezhnev could only count on three to four votes in the Presidium: Suslov, who often switched sides, Kirilenko, Pelše and Dmitry Polyansky. Brezhnev and Kosygin often disagreed on policy; Brezhnev was a conservative while Kosygin was a modest reformer. Kosygin, who had begun his premiership as Brezhnev's equal, lost much power and influence within the Presidium when he introduced the 1965–1971 Soviet economic reform. After the reshuffling process of the Presidium ended in mid-to-late 1970, the Soviet leadership evolved into a gerontocracy, a form of rule in which the rulers are significantly older than most of the adult population; this meant that fewer up-and-comers were promoted to top party positions.

Composition

Members

Candidates

References
General
Full- and candidate membership of the Presidium were taken from these sources:
  
  
Specific

Bibliography

 
 
 
 

Politburo of the Central Committee of the Communist Party of the Soviet Union members
1966 in the Soviet Union
1967 in the Soviet Union
1968 in the Soviet Union
1969 in the Soviet Union
1970 in the Soviet Union
1971 in the Soviet Union
1966 establishments in the Soviet Union
1971 disestablishments in the Soviet Union